Prester John is a fictional character appearing in American comic books published by Marvel Comics. The character is based loosely on the legendary Christian king Prester John. 

Prester John first appeared in Fantastic Four Vol.1 #54 (September 1966). He has mostly appeared as a villain, opposing Thor and Deadpool as well as the Fantastic Four.

Fictional character biography
Prester John is a centuries-old explorer who was born in an unnamed kingdom in Eastern Asia, which he once ruled. He has been a priest, a king, an adventurer, a traveler, and explorer. He was an ally of King Richard the Lionhearted and served in his court.  He is the possessor of the Evil Eye, a mystic object of power which was bestowed upon him in the extra-dimensional land of Avalon, and which can project vast amounts of energy.

Prester John was preserved from the 12th century until modern times in the Chair of Survival by the alchemists of Avalon. When he awoke, he met the Human Torch and Wyatt Wingfoot and witnessed the seeming destruction of the Evil Eye. Prester John later became temporarily possessed by an alien power-stone and battled the Thing and Iron Man.

Prester John later time-traveled by unknown means back to the 12th century. There, he recovered the Evil Eye, which had been reassembled in the present and brought back to the past by the Defenders. He then remained in the 12th century. It was later revealed how he was thrown back to the 12th century by Kang. There, he battled the time-traveling Thor (Eric Masterson).

Prester John is allied with the would-be messiah Cable, serving as the "Head of Multi-Religious Studies" for the island nation Providence.

Later, he is found working with the Knights of Wundagore, claiming to be a harbinger of Nul, the Breaker of Worlds.

Powers and abilities
Prester John is an athletic man with a gifted intellect, but no superhuman powers. He is an excellent swordsman and is proficient with most known weapons of 12th century Europe and Asia. He has many years of experience as a priest, a king, a warrior, and an explorer. He wears a special suit of medieval body armor. He is usually armed with a sword and a staff.

Prester John has sometimes carried the Evil Eye, a magical power object able to project bolts of concussive force, to disintegrate matter, and to create and destroy force fields. He has also used the Chair of Survival, a device that places Prester John in suspended animation. Prester John once briefly possessed superhuman strength and durability conferred upon him while he was possessed by an alien power-stone, the Stone of Power. Once freed from its influence, his abilities returned to normal.

References

External links

The Wanderer - Marvel Universe Wiki

Comics characters introduced in 1966
Marvel Comics characters with superhuman strength
Marvel Comics supervillains